Juan Antonio Jasso Almaraz (11 March 1935 – 26 June 2013) was a Mexican professional football forward who played for Mexico in the 1962 FIFA World Cup. He also played for Club América.

References

External links

1935 births
Mexican footballers
Mexico international footballers
Association football forwards
Club América footballers
1962 FIFA World Cup players
Liga MX players
2013 deaths